The McEwan Hall is the graduation hall of the University of Edinburgh, in Edinburgh, the capital of Scotland.  It was presented to the university in 1897 by William McEwan, brewer and politician, at a cost of £115,000 (Approximately £19 million in money today). Sir Robert Rowand Anderson was the architect. The McEwan Hall is a category A listed building. 

The design was begun in 1876 and was largely undertaken by George Mackie Watson whilst working in the offices of Robert Rowand Anderson (with the masterplan being by Rowand Anderson himself).  It was built using stone from Prudham Quarry, Hexham in Northumberland. 

The exterior of the D-shaped hall was completed in 1894. The interior, finished in 1897, is built in Italian Renaissance style, and features mural decorations from the hand of William Mainwaring Palin.   The central piece of art is a large painted work known as "The Temple of Fame" depicting a great number of philosophers and students. The McEwan Hall organ was built in 1897 by Robert Hope-Jones, and has been rebuilt and modified on various occasions afterwards.  

Another striking feature of the McEwan Hall is its large dome. On the inside of the dome is a biblical inscription: Wisdom is the principal thing, therefore get wisdom, and with all thy getting, get understanding. Exalt her and she shall bring thee to honour. (Proverbs 4:7).

In 2015 the hall and Bristo Square closed for refurbishment and reopened in time for the July 2017 graduations at a projected cost of £35 million. New heating, ventilation and lighting was integrated with the original interior and new seminar rooms created in the basement and below Bristo Square. One of the project's key aims was to provide easy access to all areas, including the second floor gallery. The McEwan Hall is used for graduations, lectures and public talks, some Edinburgh Festival Fringe events and organ recitals.

Gallery

Footnotes

References 
 
 

Buildings and structures of the University of Edinburgh
Robert Rowand Anderson buildings